KRLY-LP is a low power FM radio station broadcasting on 107.9 MHz in Alpine, California. The station is a '501(c)(3)' and relies on sponsors and individual contributions to the station.

KRLY-LP's format features country music and serves the East County of San Diego based out of Alpine. The station also hosts local community talk, music, and advice for the Alpine area. There is live and local programming seven days a week. The station is on the air 24-hours a day.

The station manager is Chris Torrick.

External links

RLY
San Diego County, California